Buļļuciems is a residential area and neighbourhood of the city Jūrmala, Latvia.

The Jurmala open air museum is located in Buļļuciems.

References

External links 

Neighbourhoods in Jūrmala